The U.S. state of Arkansas first required its residents to register their motor vehicles and display license plates in 1911. Prior to 1911, plates were issued by cities.

, plates are issued by the Arkansas Department of Finance and Administration. Only rear plates have been required since 1944.

Passenger baseplates

1911 to 1967
The 1956 (dated 1957) issue was the first Arkansas license plate that fully complied with these standards: the 1947 (dated 1948), 1952 (dated 1953) and 1955 (dated 1956) issues were all 6 inches in height by 12 inches in width, but had non-standard mounting holes.

1968 to present

Non-passenger plates

Optional plates

College and university plates

Military and veteran plates

Organization and specialty plates
Beginning in 2000, the Arkansas Game and Fish Commission has released one wildlife-themed plate design each year, to be issued for one calendar year, although remaining stock is sometimes issued past the end of a particular plate design's year of release.

References

External links
Arkansas Office of Motor Vehicles—Specialty Plates and Placards
Arkansas license plates, 1969–present

Arkansas
Transportation in Arkansas
1911 in transport
1911 introductions
Arkansas transportation-related lists